Verkhnebaltachevo (Ürge Baltas) is a rural locality (a village) in Nizhnebaltachevsky Selsoviet, Tatyshlinsky District, Bashkortostan, Russia. The population was 189 as of 2010. There are 4 streets.

Geography 
Verkhnebaltachevo is located 21 km southeast of Verkhniye Tatyshly (the district's administrative centre) by road. Dubovka is the nearest rural locality.

References 

Rural localities in Tatyshlinsky District